55 Persei is a single, blue-white hued star in the northern constellation Perseus. It is faintly visible to the naked eye under good seeing conditions, having an apparent visual magnitude of 5.73. At that distance, the visual magnitude is diminished by an extinction of 0.39 due to interstellar dust.

This is a B-type main-sequence star with a stellar classification of B8 V; a massive star that is generating energy through hydrogen fusion at its core. It has 3.44 times the mass of the Sun and about 3 times the Sun's radius. The star is about 197 million years old and is spinning rapidly with a projected rotational velocity of 288 km/s. It is radiating roughly 193 times the Sun's luminosity from its photosphere at an effective temperature of 12,246 K.

References

B-type main-sequence stars
Perseus (constellation)
Durchmusterung objects
Persei, 55
027777
020579
1377